Pave may refer to:
 Pavement (disambiguation)
 Pavé, a stonesetting method
 Pavê, a Brazilian dessert
 Sett (paving), a kind of cobblestone road surface (from the French pavé meaning "cobblestoned")
 Pave Maijanen, a Finnish musician
 Zaspal Pave, Croatian folk song

Paves may refer to:
 Paves, Lombard troubadour (poet) of the first half of the thirteenth century
 Ken Pavés, a hair stylist known for his work with a variety of high-profile clients

PAVE may refer to:
 PAVE, a United States military electronic system
 Venetie Airport (ICAO location indicator: PAVE), in Venetie, Alaska, United States

Pavé may refer to:
 A cut of rump beef

See also
 Pav (disambiguation)
 Paver (disambiguation)
 Pavić (disambiguation), south Slavic surname